Daniel Amardeilh (born 22 July 1959) is a French former cyclist. He competed in the individual road race event at the 1984 Summer Olympics.

References

External links
 

1959 births
Living people
French male cyclists
Olympic cyclists of France
Cyclists at the 1984 Summer Olympics
20th-century French people